The Blues Train was founded by Hugo T. Armstrong in 1994 and is operated in partnership with Bay City Events and the Bellarine Railway as an homage to the history of the blues musicians playing on the Mississippi freight trains.  The Blues Train travels along 16 km of railway between the towns of Queenscliff and Drysdale with an intermediate stop at Suma Park, on the Bellarine Peninsula and the performers rotate.

History
The Blues Train began operating in 1993 with one or two services a year and now operates approximately forty times a year on Saturday evenings between August and occasional Fridays in December.  

The Blues Train has hosted a range of blues acts including Chris Wilson (Australian musician), Jimi Hocking, Claude Hay, Ezra Lee (musician) and others. The train was nominated for a 2020 Music Victoria Award.

See also

List of blues festivals

References

External links
 The Blues Train

Music festivals established in 1993
Tourist railways in Victoria (Australia)
Heritage railways in Australia
Blues festivals in Australia
Folk festivals in Australia
Bellarine Peninsula
1993 establishments in Australia